Igor Leonidovich Chislenko (4 January 1939 — 22 September 1994) was a Soviet association football player. He played over 200 league games for FC Dinamo Moscow, winning two Soviet league titles and the Soviet Cup on one occasion. He also played for the USSR national football team, appearing 53 times, and scoring 20 goals. He was on the 1962 and 1966 World Cup teams.

References

External links

  RussiaTeam biography
 

1939 births
1994 deaths
Soviet footballers
Soviet bandy players
Russian footballers
1962 FIFA World Cup players
1964 European Nations' Cup players
1966 FIFA World Cup players
UEFA Euro 1968 players
Soviet Top League players
FC Dynamo Moscow players
FC Zhenis Astana players
Footballers from Moscow
Soviet Union international footballers
Association football forwards
FC FShM Torpedo Moscow players